Tom Gale (born 18 December 1998) is an English athlete specialising in the high jump. He won bronze medal at the 2017 European U20 Championships. In 2018 he competed at the 2018 Commonwealth Games without qualifying for the final.  In 2019 he won the Silver medal at the 2019 European U23 Championships.

His personal bests in the event are 2.30 metres (Bedford 2017) and 2.33 metres indoors (Hustopeče, Czech Republic 2020).

At the 2020 Olympics, held in 2021, he was one of thirteen who qualified for the final by jumping 2.28, his season's best. He placed 11th after three attempts at 2.30.

Gale is from Trowbridge, Wiltshire, where he attended John of Gaunt School.

International competitions

References

External links
 
 

1998 births
Living people
English male high jumpers
People from Trowbridge
Sportspeople from Wiltshire
Athletes (track and field) at the 2018 Commonwealth Games
Athletes (track and field) at the 2020 Summer Olympics
Commonwealth Games competitors for England
British Athletics Championships winners
Olympic athletes of Great Britain